This is a list of the auto racing governing bodies for the United States and the series they govern.

Current

Automobile Racing Club of America 

 ARCA Menards Racing Series
 ARCA Re-Max Series
 ARCA Truck Series
 ARCA CRA Super Series
 ARCA Midwest Tour
 ARCA OK Tire Sportsman Series

INDYCAR 

 IndyCar Series
 Indy Lights
 Pro Mazda Championship 
 U.S. F2000 National Championship

ICSCC 

 Spec Miata
 Improved Touring

International Hot Rod Association 

 Knoll-Gas Nitro Jam Drag Racing Series
 O'Reilly Auto Parts Thunder Jam
 The Summit Pro-Am Tour
 The Summit SuperSeries

International Motor Sports Association 

 WeatherTech SportsCar Championship
 IMSA Continental Tire Sports Car Challenge
 Mazda Prototype Lites 
 IMSA GT3 Cup Challenge
 IMSA GT3 Cup Challenge Canada
 Ferrari Challenge
 Lamborghini Super Trofeo

National Association for Stock Car Auto Racing 

 Camping World Truck Series
 Xfinity Series
 NASCAR Cup Series
 Whelen Modified Tour
 Pinty's Series
 NASCAR Mexico Series
 NASCAR Whelen Euro Series
 NASCAR Advance Auto Parts Weekly Series

National Auto Sport Association 

 944 Challenge
 American Iron
 American Stock Car Challenge
 BMWCCA
 Camaro Mustang Challenge
 Factory Five Challenge
 Formula TR
 GTS Challenge
 Honda Challenge
 Legends Racing
 MX-5 Challenge
 NASA Rally Sport
 Performance Touring
 Porsche Racing Challenge
 Pro Truck
 Spec E30
 Spec Focus
 Spec Miata Challenge
 Super Touring
 Super Unlimited
 United States Touring Car Championship

National Hot Rod Association 

 Jr. Drag Racing League
 Lucas Oil Drag Racing Series
 NHRA Camping World Drag Racing Series
 Summit Racing Series

American Rally Association 
The American Rally Association National Championship Series is the premier stage rally championship in the United States. From coast to coast, the top competitors from N. America and Europe compete at high speeds in street legal cars, on all types of drive-able surfaces. Teams from Subaru Rally Team, Team O'Neil Motorsports, Honda Performance Development, and Dirt Fish compete alongside the fastest privateers like Phoenix Project (phxpjt.com) and McKenna Motorsports. Rally is the oldest form of motorsport that takes place on public or private roads with modified production or specially built road-legal cars. It is distinguished by running not on a circuit, but instead in a point-to-point format in which participants and their co-drivers drive between set control points (special stages), leaving at regular intervals from one or more start points.

Formula D 
 Formula Drift Professional Drifting Championship
 Formula Drift Team Drift
 Red Bull Drifting World Championship

Sports Car Club of America 

 Pirelli World Challenge
 Trans-Am Series
 Global Mazda MX-5 Cup
 United States Formula 4 Championship
 Atlantic Championship
 F2000 Championship Series
 F1600 Championship Series
 Formula 1000
 Formula 500
 Improved Touring

United States Auto Club 

 Silver Crown Series
 Sprint Car Series
 National Midget Series
 HPD Midget Series
 TORC: The Off Road Championship

Southern California Timing Association

 Bonneville Salt Flats
 El Mirage Dry Lake

United States Hot Rod Association 

 Monster Jam

World of Outlaws

 Sprint Car Series
 Late Model Series

Former

Championship Auto Racing Teams (1979-2008)

 Champ Car World Series
 Indy Lights
 Atlantic Championship
 Barber Pro Series
 North American Touring Car Championship

Grand American Road Racing Association (2000-2013)

 Ferrari Challenge
 Ford Racing Mustang Challenge
 Koni Challenge Series
 Rolex Sports Car Series

 
Ggoverning bodies,United States
United States